Laura Belotti (born 2 December 1966) is an Italian swimmer. She competed in the women's 200 metre breaststroke at the 1984 Summer Olympics.

References

External links
 

1966 births
Living people
Olympic swimmers of Italy
Swimmers at the 1984 Summer Olympics
Swimmers from Rome
Italian female breaststroke swimmers